Kerry Owen (born 23 June 1943) is an Australian cricketer. He played one first-class match for New South Wales in 1965/66.

See also
 List of New South Wales representative cricketers

References

External links
 

1943 births
Living people
Australian cricketers
New South Wales cricketers
Cricketers from Sydney